Eduardo Elías Espinosa Abuxapqui (born 11 April 1954) is a Mexican politician from the Institutional Revolutionary Party. From 2006 to 2009 he served as Deputy of the LX Legislature of the Mexican Congress representing Quintana Roo, and he previously served as the municipal president of Othón P. Blanco from 2002 to 2005.

References

1954 births
Living people
Politicians from Quintana Roo
People from Chetumal, Quintana Roo
Members of the Chamber of Deputies (Mexico)
Institutional Revolutionary Party politicians
21st-century Mexican politicians
20th-century Mexican people
Municipal presidents in Quintana Roo